Heidy Margarita Rodríguez López (born ) is a Cuban female volleyball player. She is part of the Cuba women's national volleyball team. On club level she played for Villa Clara in 2014.

Clubs
  Agel Prostějov (2016-2017)

Awards

Individuals
 2015 NORCECA Championship "Best Opposite"

References

External links
 Profile at FIVB.org

1993 births
Living people
Cuban women's volleyball players
Place of birth missing (living people)
Expatriate volleyball players in the Czech Republic
21st-century Cuban women